Chinsurah Deshbandhu Memorial High School is a high school in Chinsurah,  West Bengal, India.

The school is affiliated to the West Bengal Board of Secondary Education.

See also
Education in India
List of schools in India
Education in West Bengal

References

External links 

High schools and secondary schools in West Bengal
Schools in Hooghly district
1926 establishments in British India
Educational institutions established in 1926